The Albanian nobility was an elite hereditary ruling class in Albania, parts of the western Balkans and later in parts of the Ottoman world. The Albanian nobility was composed of landowners of vast areas, often in allegiance to states like the Byzantine Empire, various Serbian states, the Republic of Venice, the Ottoman Empire and the Kingdom of Naples in addition to the Albanian principalities. They often used Byzantine, Latin or Slavic titles, such as sebastokrator, despot, dux, conte and zupan.

Byzantine Empire 

The Muzaka family was loyal to the Byzantine Empire. For their loyalty to Byzantium, the head of the family Andrea II Muzaka gained the title of Despot in 1335, while other Muzakas continued to pursue careers in Byzantine administration in Constantinople.

Principality of Arbanon 

The first Albanian state in the Middle Ages it was ruled by the Progoni family and extended from the Drin river to the southern boundary of the Ohrid lake. Its rulers were known in Catholic sources with the titles of judices, while in Byzantine ones the titles mentioned are those of the grand archon and the panhypersebastos.

Kingdom of Serbia 
When Durrës was captured by the Kingdom of Serbia, Milutin was titled the King of Albania while his rule was occasionally recognized by Albanian noblemen around Durrës. Many Albanian noblemen were included in the feudal hierarchy of the Kingdom of Serbia and had titles and privileges of župans, voivodas or kaznacs.

Serbian Empire 

Albanian nobility was included into hierarchy of the feudal system of Serbian Empire without any discrimination and participated in the work of the highest government institutions, where Albanian archons had the same rights as the Serbian nobility had. Serbian emperor wanted to gain the support of the Albanian nobility so he confirmed the privileges Kruje had been granted by the Byzantine Empire.

Ottoman Empire 

A decisive point of the relation of Albanian nobility with Ottoman Empire was the Battle of Savra in 1385. After the Battle of Savra Albanian nobility became vassals of the Ottoman Empire.

Albanian nobility did not fight against Ottomans with united and compact forces like Serbian and Bulgarian aristocracy, but with small independent local rulers. Therefore, the Ottomans, who have been since claimed to be "brutal and cruel" to the Serbian and Bulgarian nobility, might have been conciliatory with the Albanian nobility.

When Albania became part of the Ottoman Empire, it was divided into sanjaks with numerous timars. Many members of the Albanian nobility held high rank positions within Ottoman the hierarchy, like Skanderbeg and Ballaban Badera who were Ottoman sanjakbeys. Some members of the Albanian nobility were Ottoman timariots. Through the implementation of the timar system the Albanian nobility was absorbed into the Ottoman military class within not more than two generations. They adopted the Ottoman titles like agha, bey or pasha. However, there was also a significant amount of resistance to Ottoman rule from Albanian nobility, as evidenced by the Albanian revolt of 1432–1436 and Skanderbeg's rebellion.

Venetian Republic 

During the period of crisis for the Ottoman Empire after the Battle of Ankara in 1402 several Ottoman vassals from Albania including Gjon Kastrioti, Niketas Thopia and Nicola Zaccaria, recognized Venetian suzerainty. Numerous members of Albanian noble families were Venetian pronoiers. Many Albanian noblemen fought against Skanderbeg within Venetian forces during Albanian–Venetian War.

Kingdom of Naples 
In 1451, many Albanian noblemen became vassals of the Kingdom of Naples. The first was Skanderbeg who signed the Treaty of Gaeta on March 26, 1451 and after him many other Albanian noblemen like George Araniti, Ghin Musachi, George Strez Balšić, Peter Spani, Pal Dukagjini, Thopia Musachi, Peter of Himara, Simon Zenebishi and Carlo II Tocco signed similar treaties. Skanderbeg had to fulfill his vassal obligations to send his forces to Italy to support Ferdinand I of Naples in his struggle against the Angevin Dynasty. In return, the Kingdom of Naples provided financial and military support to its vassals in Albania and maintained a permanent garrison in Kruje.

Religion and language 
The religion of the Albanian nobility depended on the religion of their lords, or the power that could threaten their political existence. Until the end of 14th century the Albanian nobility were Christians (Orthodox or Catholic). After the Battle of Savra in 1385 most of the local Albanian nobility became vassals of the Ottoman Empire and began converting to Islam. In the end of 17th century the Albanian nobility was majority islamized.

The official language of correspondence in the Medieval principalities in Albania controlled by local nobility were Greek, Latin or Slavic.

Restoration 
An attempt to restore the monarchy in 1997 was rejected by about two-thirds of those voting in a referendum. Former noble families and their descendants are still a part of society in Albania, but they no longer retain any specific privileges.

Noble families 
This is a list of Albanian noble families, which also includes families that are of Albanian descent.

 Albani family
 Alltuni family
 Arianiti family
 Arvanitaki family
 Balshaj family
 Begolli family
 Blinishti family
 Bua/Shpata family
 Bushati family
 Bruni family
 Bruti family
 Dukagjini family
 Dushmani family
 Durazzo family
 Engjëlli family
 Frashëri family
 Gropa family
 Gjini family
 Gjika family
 Humoja family
 Jonima family
 Losha family
 Crutta family
 Kastrioti family

 Qypryli (Köprülü) family
 Kyrias family
 Kryeziu family
 Mjeda family
 Mataranga family
 Muhammad Ali dynasty
 Muzaka family
 Niutta family
 Pamalioti family
 Progoni family
 Spani family
 Skuraj family
 Taushani family
 Topia family
 Toptani family
 Vorpsi family 
 Vrioni family
 Zaharia family
 Zenebishi family
 Zogu family

References